The Glaisnock River is a river in the Southland Region of New Zealand. It arises between the Stuart and Franklin Mountains, and flows east and south-east into the North Fiord of Lake Te Anau.

See also
List of rivers of New Zealand

References

Land Information New Zealand - Search for Place Names

Rivers of Fiordland